Eudonia anthracias is a moth of the family Crambidae. It was described by Edward Meyrick in 1885  and it is found in Australia.

References

Eudonia
Moths described in 1885